This is a squad list for the 2019 CONCACAF U-17 Championship, the continental association football tournament for players under the age of 17. Each national team was allowed to choose twenty players to represent their country in the tournament. All players born on or after 1 January 2002 were eligible to play the tournament.

Group E

Mexico
Head coach:

Jamaica
Head coach:

Trinidad and Tobago
Head coach:

Bermuda
Head coach:

Group F

United States
Head coach:  Raphaël Wicky

Canada
Head coach: Andrew Olivieri

Guatemala
Head coach:

Barbados
Head coach:

Group G

Honduras
Head coach: José Valladares

The 20-man squad was announced on 22 April 2019.

Haiti
Head coach:

El Salvador
Head coach:

Guyana
Head coach:

Group H

Costa Rica

Panama
Head coach:

Suriname

Curaçao
Head coach:

Knockout stage

Nicaragua
Head coach:

Dominican Republic
Head coach:

Guadeloupe
Head coach:

Puerto Rico
Head coach:

References 

CONCACAF U-17 Championship squads
squads